Steve MacArthur (born 21 December 1973) is an Australian professional darts player who plays in Professional Darts Corporation events.

In 2007, he qualified for the 2008 PDC World Darts Championship, where he lost 3–0 in the first round to James Wade.

World Championship Results

PDC
 2008: Last 64: (lost to James Wade 0–3)

References

External links

1973 births
Living people
Australian darts players
Professional Darts Corporation associate players
Sportspeople from Sydney